Vatica endertii is a tree in the family Dipterocarpaceae, native to Borneo. It is named for the Dutch botanist F. H. Endert.

Description

Distribution and habitat
Vatica endertii is endemic to Borneo.

Conservation
Vatica endertii has been assessed as endangered on the IUCN Red List. It is threatened by logging for its timber, which is used for furniture and buildings. The species' habitat is threatened by conversion of land for agriculture. The species does not occur in protected areas.

References

endertii
Endemic flora of Borneo
Plants described in 1942